Canal Seis is the flagship television channel of Telecorporacion Salvadoreña. It broadcasts from channel 6 nationwide in El Salvador.

It is believed to be the country's first television station, having launched in 1956. Color broadcasts commenced in 1973.

The channel has a general schedule on weekdays and is focused on movies on weekends.

History

Early years 
The first attempts to create television were made by the Mexican Inventor Rubén González on his own initiative on September 7, 1956, in black and white broadcast. In that same month Boris Eserski, Guillermo Pinto and Tono Alfaro, former owners of the radio station YSEB, collaborated in this creation. The first television channel launched was YSEB-TV. Its programming was based on national artistic presentations and films imported from Mexico and the United States Its programming was very short, it began at 4 in the afternoon and ended at 10 in the evening.

Days later, two other programs that Channel 6 had were included, one was a project of the Salvadoran writer Eugenio Martínez Orantes, who recited his poems live while a classical dance group interpreted them musically. And the Teleperiódico program hosted by Álvaro Menéndez Leal, a Salvadoran writer. A Month later, Channel 6 implemented some new programming with Saturday Concerts, hosted by musician Nicolás Arene and Televariedades Pilsener.

In 1959, it took Channel 8 as a repeater, to cover a larger area nationwide. A year later, the television stations suffered a stagnation and a union was created between channels 4 and 6, which lasted until 1966, when Channel 6 interrupted its transmissions for the first time. In times, Channel 2 had been preferred by some audience. In July 1966, an agreement is signed to operate  Canal 4.

On April 6, 1973, Canal Seis SA relaunched the company through YSLA-TV, which was the first to introduce color television, in 1986, Canal 2 and 4 merged to form Telecorporación Salvadoreña.

Gallery

Notes

Television stations in El Salvador
1973 establishments in El Salvador
Telecorporación Salvadoreña
Spanish-language television stations
Television channels and stations established in 1973